Brubaker is a 1980 American prison drama film.

Brubaker may also refer to:

Brubaker Box, kit car model designed by Curtis Brubaker
Bill Brubaker (1910–1978), American baseball player
Bruce Brubaker, American pianist, recording artist
Bruce Brubaker (baseball) (born 1941), American pitcher
Christine Brubaker, Canadian actress
Clifford E. Brubaker, American academic
Ed Brubaker (born 1966), American comic writer
Harold J. Brubaker (born 1946), politician
Howard Brubaker (1882−1957), American magazine editor and writer
J. T. Brubaker (born 1993), American baseball player
James D. Brubaker (1937-2023), American actor
Jeff Brubaker (born 1958), American ice hockey player
Rockne Brubaker (born 1986), American pair skater
Rogers Brubaker (born 1956), sociologist

Fictional characters 

Howard Brubaker, a character in the film The April Fools